John Shaw Stewart FRSE (1793–1840) was a 19th-century Scottish advocate and essayist.

Life
He was born John Shaw Shaw-Stewart on 24 July 1793 a younger son of Sir Michael Shaw-Stewart (1766-1825) 5th Baronet of Greenock and Blackhall, and his wife, the Hon. Catherine Maxwell, daughter of Sir William Maxwell of Springkell. His brothers included Admiral Sir Houston Shaw Stewart (1791-1875).

He studied Law and qualified as an advocate in 1816. He was Advocate Depute from 1830 to 1835 and he served as Sheriff of Stirlingshire from 1838.

In 1823, he was elected a Fellow of the Royal Society of Edinburgh, his proposer being William Miller, Lord Glenlee. He was also a member of the Speculative Society of Edinburgh.

He lived at 12 Shandwick Place in Edinburgh's West End, close to Princes Street.

He died in Edinburgh on 29 June 1840 and is buried with members of his family in St Cuthbert's Churchyard at the west end of Princes Street Gardens.

Family
He married his cousin, Jane Stuart Heron-Maxwell (1806-1886), in 1827. They had two daughters and two sons, including Major General John Heron Maxwell Shaw-Stewart.

Publications
The Art of Printing
Agriculture
The Study of Political Philosophy

References

1793 births
1840 deaths
Scottish lawyers
Scottish non-fiction writers
Fellows of the Royal Society of Edinburgh
Younger sons of baronets